Leonidas Kouris (born in Athens, 1949)  is a Greek politician; former mayor of Athens and prefect of eastern Attica.

Educational and professional background 
Kouris graduated from the Varvakeio high school and has degrees in mineralogical engineering from the National Technical University of Athens and in economics from the Athens University of Economics and Business. He received postgraduate training in the Administration of Enterprises and Regional Growth.

Kouris is a member of the Technical and Economic Chamber, and of many Greek and foreign scientific associations. He has been elected repeatedly to the boards of the Technical Chamber of Greece and of the Association of Engineers. Since 1971, he has been an executive in large private and public enterprises, such as the Public Power Corporation. He was an advisor in the Ministries of Industry, Energy and Finance between 1977 and 1981.

Political career 
From 1986 Kouris served as Municipal Advisor of Athens under Mayors Miltiadis Evert and Antonis Tritsis, as Vice-Mayor of Athens from 1987 to 1992, overseeing the city's technical, administrative and economic services, and was elected mayor in April 1992, after the death of Antonis Tritsis. During his term, he put forward a wide program of work, the construction of Athens tram being a key project.

In 1994, to his consternation, Kouris failed to run as New Democracy candidate mayor for Athens, with Dimitris Avramopoulos earning the nomination instead. In 1995, Mayor Avramopoulos awarded his predecessor, Kouris, the Golden Medal of Athens, a major honour of this municipality.

As head of KEDKE, he pursued the enlargement of the administrative autonomy and financial self-reliance of municipalities and their communities. During his term, the elected prefectural self-government by the people was first introduced in Greece.

Kouris was head of the delegation of Greek local self-government in the Council of Europe (1993–1994) and a member of the presiding board of the Committee of Regions of the European Union (1994–1995).

From 1995 to 1997, he was an advisor to the leader of the New Democracy party and Chairman of the KETA (Central Committee of Local Self-government) of New Democracy. In 1997, he was elected on the party's Central Committee. From 1997 to 2000, he was a deputy from Attica. He was elected chairman of Internal commission of New Democracy and appointed special rapporteur on prefectural and local self-government in the Budget. He served on the Permanent Committees of Economic Affairs, Internal–Public Administration, and Educational Affairs.

He ran unsuccessfully for a parliamentary seat in the 2000 election. He returned to local politics and in October 2002 was elected Prefect of Eastern Attica (50.1%)—himself resident of [Pikermi] for 30 years—and for a second term in the 2006 election (54.6%), in which however he exacerbated building disorder in the district by expeditiously legalising thousands of illegally constructed acres of land.

After the October 2009 elections, although he was the only New Democracy prefect in Attica, he abstained from taking part in his party's bid for ENAE, issuing later a statement in defence of his non-participation decision pleading his commitment to principles.

Kouris has also been linked in 1998, 2002 and 2006 for running as Super-Prefect of Athens and Piraeus.

He is married to Aggela Bas Xintara with whom he has three children, Eirianna, Vasilis and Nikos.

References

1949 births
Living people
Athens University of Economics and Business alumni
National Technical University of Athens alumni
New Democracy (Greece) politicians
Mayors of Athens
Greek MPs 1996–2000
Politicians from Athens